Sucharit is a given name. Notable people with the name include:

 Sucharit Bhakdi (born 1946), Thai-German microbiologist
 Sucharit Sarkar (born 1983), topologist and associate professor of mathematics
 Sucharit Suda (1895–1982), Thai consort